WZZK-FM (104.7 FM) is a country music-formatted radio station licensed to Birmingham that serves northern and central Alabama. As of January 3, 2007, WZZK-FM is the flagship station of the Rick and Bubba radio network.  It was the first FM station in Birmingham to switch to country music, and throughout much of the 1980s and 1990s was the top-rated radio station in Birmingham. The station is owned by SummitMedia alongside six other stations, and all share studios in the Cahaba neighborhood in far southeastern Birmingham. Its transmitter is located atop Red Mountain in Birmingham.

History
The 104.7 frequency was originally put on the air as the sister station of WJLD/1400.  It began in 1948 as WJLN-FM and originally repeated the rhythm and blues music format of the AM station.  By the end of the 1960s, WJLN began playing progressive rock music at night, while continuing the daytime simulcast of WJLD.

In 1973, the call letters of WJLN were changed to WZZK.  With the new call letters, WZZK became a full-time album rock station.  The station's main competitor in this format was WERC-FM.  However, the station failed to attract a significant listening audience.  In 1977, WVOK-FM (K-99) made its on-air debut as another album rock station, forcing WZZK to abandon the format a year later.

In 1978, WZZK changed formats and became Birmingham's first FM country music station, challenging long-time market leader WYDE.  Initially, the new WZZK was automated, with no live studio announcers.  The station began adding announcers in 1980 and began to assert itself in the Birmingham area.  By 1982, the success of WZZK forced WYDE to drop the country music it had aired since 1963.  Throughout most of the 1980s and 1990s, WZZK was ranked no lower than #3 in the Birmingham Arbitron ratings, despite challenges from first WQUS, then from WBMH, later WIKX.  Neither station made a significant impact; in fact, the parent company of WZZK bought WIKX in 1991 and changed its format.

In 1985, the first of two AM stations that had the WZZK call letters made its debut.  Longtime Top 40 powerhouse WSGN (610) was purchased and began a simulcast that continued until 1998.  The AM station is now one of the more successful urban gospel stations in Birmingham.  In 2003, the second WZZK (AM) debuted as a classic country station at 1320 AM (now WENN).  The second WZZK AM changed formats in January 2006, and is now a simulcast of WAGG.

The most serious and successful challenge to WZZK's dominance came in 1994, when WZBQ, a station licensed to Jasper that had previously targeted the Tuscaloosa area, moved its studios to Birmingham and relaunched itself as WOWC.  The new competitor, by then having the new call letters WDXB, gradually began chipping away at WZZK's audience, and in 2002, began broadcasting from atop Red Mountain in Birmingham, where most of the market's FM stations have their broadcast towers located.  In 2006, WZZK and WDXB were the two dominant country music stations in Birmingham.

In 1999, the station was given the National Association of Broadcasters Friend In Need Radio Award for outstanding service in the face of natural disasters.

On January 2, 2007, it was announced that the popular morning-drive radio team of Rick and Bubba would be moving their show from crosstown rival WYSF to WZZK, effective the next day.

On July 20, 2012, Cox Radio, Inc. announced the sale of WZZK and 22 other stations to SummitMedia LLC for $66.25 million. The sale was consummated on May 3, 2013.

References

External links
WZZK official website
Official Website of Rick and Bubba

ZZK-FM
Country radio stations in the United States
Radio stations established in 1948
1948 establishments in Alabama